Mathieu Beaudoin (born November 9, 1974) is a former Canadian football offensive lineman who played one season with the BC Lions of the Canadian Football League. He was drafted by the BC Lions in the second round of the 1999 CFL Draft and played college football at Syracuse University.

External links
Just Sports Stats
NFL Draft Scout
Fanbase profile

Living people
1974 births
Players of Canadian football from Quebec
American football offensive linemen
Canadian football offensive linemen
Syracuse Orange football players
BC Lions players
Canadian football people from Montreal